Alycaeus is a genus of small land snails with a gill and an operculum, terrestrial gastropod mollusks in the family Cyclophoridae. It is the type genus of the subfamily Alycaeinae.

Distribution
There are recognized 23 species of Alycaeus in Peninsular Malaysia.

Species 
Species within the genus Alycaeus include:

 Alycaeus alticola Foon & Liew, 2017
 Alycaeus altis
 Alycaeus altis pirus Möllendorff, 1902
 Alycaeus balingensis Tomlin, 1948
 Alycaeus carinata Maassen, 2006
Alycaeus charasensis Foon & Liew, 2017
Alycaeus clementsi Foon & Liew, 2017
 Alycaeus conformis Fulton, 1902
Alycaeus costacrassa Foon & Liew, 2017
Alycaeus expansus Foon & Liew, 2017
 Alycaeus galbanus Godwin-Austen, 1889
 Alycaeus gibbosulus Stoliczka, 1872
 Alycaeus globosus Adams, 1870
 Alycaeus hosei Godwin-Austen, 1889
Alycaeus ikanensis Foon & Liew, 2017
 Alycaeus jousseaumei Morgan, 1885
 Alycaeus kapayanensis Morgan, 1885
 Alycaeus kelantanensis Sykes, 1902
Alycaeus kurauensis Foon & Liew, 2017
 Alycaeus liratulus Preston, 1907
 Alycaeus perakensis Crosse, 1879
Alycaeus regalis Foon & Liew, 2017
 Alycaues roebeleni Möllendorff, 1894
Alycaeus selangoriensis Foon & Liew, 2017
Alycaeus senyumensis Foon & Liew, 2017
 Alycaeus thieroti Morgan, 1885
Alycaeus virgogravida Foon & Liew, 2017

References

External links

 Baird W. (1850). Nomenclature of molluscous animals and shells in the collection of the British Museum. Part I. Cyclophoridae. British Museum, London. 69 pp.

Cyclophoridae

vi:Alycaeus balingensis